The 1980 Buffalo Bills season was the franchise's 11th season in the National Football League, and the 21st overall. Their 11–5 record was tied for best in the AFC.

The Bills' defense allowed only 260 points in 1980, third-best in the league, whilst their 4,101 total yards surrendered was best in the NFL in 1980. Buffalo's defense was well represented on the UPI All-AFC team: nose tackle Fred Smerlas and linebacker Jim Haslett – two-thirds of Buffalo's "Bermuda Triangle" with linebacker Shane Nelson – were named to the 1st team All-AFC. Defensive end Ben Williams was named to the second team.

Although Buffalo's offensive statistics were not as impressive as its defense, four offensive players were named All-AFC: left guard Reggie McKenzie, left tackle Ken Jones, wide receiver Jerry Butler and rookie running back Joe Cribbs.

Cribbs rushed for 1,185 yards and made his first Pro Bowl. Jerry Butler and Fred Smerlas also were selected to play in the annual all-star game.

Breaking "The Streak"
The Bills had not beaten the Miami Dolphins in the entire decade of the 1970s, a streak of twenty straight losses, the longest in NFL history. The last time the Bills had defeated Miami was 1969.

The Bills had been outscored 565 (28.5 points per games) to 299 (14.5) during the 1970s by the Dolphins, failing to score more than ten points in over a third of the contests (7). They were shut out three times. Conversely, the Dolphins were held under twenty points just four times, and scored 45 points on the Bills twice. The domination was so thorough that the Bills only lost by one score or less five times, and Don Shula had never lost to Buffalo since taking over as Dolphins coach in 1970. The Bills only held a lead at any point in eight of the games, and only twice in the fourth quarter. Joe Ferguson had lost to the Dolphins 14 straight times.

On opening day of the 1980 season, Miami visited Rich Stadium, attempting to extend the streak to 21 games. At the end of three quarters, Miami led 7–3. In the fourth quarter, running back Roosevelt Leaks scored the go-ahead touchdown to make the score 10–7. Joe Cribbs added a second touchdown to extend the lead to 17–7, and Jeff Nixon intercepted his third pass of the game with only 36 seconds left, breaking the streak at 20 games.

A rowdy crowd of 79,000 fans celebrated, and many stormed the field to tear down the goal posts, carrying them around the field. Joe Cribbs contributed 131 combined yards of offense for the triumphant Bills.

The rivalry continued well into the 1990s, but with different results: from 1986 to 1996—the years in which Bills quarterback Jim Kelly and Dolphins quarterback Dan Marino played at the same time—the Bills won 14 of 22 match-ups between the teams.

Offseason

NFL draft

North Carolina State's Jim Ritcher became an anchor of the Buffalo offensive line for the next 14 years; he was the starter for all four Buffalo Super Bowl teams, and was second-team All-Pro in 1991.

Running back Joe Cribbs was Buffalo's starting running back from 1980–1983, and again in 1985 (after returning from one year in the USFL).

Tight end Mark Brammer played for the Bills for five seasons. Greg Cater was Buffalo's starting punter from 1980 until 1983.

Personnel

Staff/Coaches

Roster

Regular season
Sports Illustrateds Paul Zimmerman wrote about the Bills' 1980 season, "It was a euphoric kind of year for Buffalo. Chuck Knox and his defensive coordinator, Tom Catlin, built the defense into No. 1 in the NFL with virtually the same people who had been lousy in '79. The Bills even beat Miami for the first time in a generation. And then Quarterback Joe Ferguson picked exactly the wrong time of year to sprain his ankle – the playoffs. And San Diego ended the dream."

ScheduleNote: Intra-division opponents are in bold' text.

Standings

Game summaries

Week 1 vs Dolphins

Week 2 vs Jets

Week 3 at Saints

Week 4 vs Raiders

Week 5 at Chargers

Week 6 vs Colts

Week 7 at Dolphins

Week 8 vs Patriots

Week 9

Week 10

Week 11

Week 12

Week 13

Week 14

First ever win for Buffalo vs Rams

Week 15

Week 16

Postseason

Divisional

With 2:08 left in the game, Chargers quarterback Dan Fouts threw the 50-yard winning touchdown pass to receiver Ron Smith to defeat the Bills, 20–14.

Wrote Paul Zimmerman in Sports Illustrated's 1981 NFL preview, "If Charley Romes intercepts the pass that bounces off his chest in the last few minutes of the playoff game against San Diego, then the Chargers don't score on the next play, and win the game. And Buffalo gets to play Oakland at home – where the Bills crushed the Raiders earlier in the season. And Buffalo's in the Super Bowl."

Notable events
In Week 15, the Bills became the thirty-fourth team to score only a safety in a full game. It was the first occurrence of this since the San Diego Chargers against the Pittsburgh Steelers in the last game of the 1972 season, and there have been only three since, by the 1983 Minnesota Vikings, the 1993 Cincinnati Bengals, and the 2011 Atlanta Falcons in a playoff game.

References

 Bills on Pro Football Reference
 Bills on jt-sw.com
 Bills Stats on jt-sw.com

Buffalo Bills seasons
AFC East championship seasons
Buffalo Bills
Buffalo